Gordon Walter Fashoway (June 16, 1926 – May 1, 2012) was a Canadian professional ice hockey left winger. During the 1950–51 season, he played in his only 13 National Hockey League (NHL) games for the Chicago Black Hawks. He was born in Portage la Prairie, Manitoba.

Following the Black Hawks, Fashoway played for several teams in the Western Hockey League: the New Westminster Royals, Victoria Cougars, and Portland Buckaroos, where he ended his professional career in 1963.

Upon the conclusion of his playing career, he entered coaching. He became an assistant coach with the expansion Oakland Seals for one year in 1968; after the resignation of Bert Olmstead, he served as head coach of this club for the final ten games of the Seals' inaugural year. He then returned to coach the Buckaroos from 1969 to 1973. Under his leadership, the Buckaroos captured their third WCHL championship in the 1970–71.

Awards and achievements 
Turnbull Cup MJHL Championship (1946)
Memorial Cup Championship (1946)
USHL First All-Star Team (1950)
PCHL First All-Star Team (1952)
WHL Coast Division Second All-Star Team (1957, 1958, & 1961)
WHL Championship (1961)
WHL Championship as coach (1971)
"Honoured Member" of the Manitoba Hockey Hall of Fame

Coaching record

References

External links

Gord Fashoway's biography at Manitoba Hockey Hall of Fame

1926 births
2012 deaths
California Golden Seals coaches
Canadian ice hockey coaches
Canadian ice hockey left wingers
Chicago Blackhawks players
Ice hockey people from Manitoba
New Westminster Royals players
Sportspeople from Portage la Prairie
Portland Buckaroos players
Victoria Cougars (1949–1961) players
Winnipeg Monarchs players